Diplodira is a monotypic moth genus in the family Erebidae. Its only species, Diplodira jamaicalis, is endemic to Jamaica. Both the genus and the species were first described by William Schaus in 1916.

References

Moths described in 1916
Herminiinae
Endemic fauna of Jamaica
Monotypic moth genera